Henry Morgan Dockrell (17 April 1880 – 26 October 1955) was an Irish Cumann na nGaedheal and Fine Gael politician who was elected to both Dáil Éireann and Seanad Éireann.

Early life
Dockrell was born on 17 April 1880 at the family home, 10 Waltham Terrace, Blackrock, Dublin. He was educated privately, and for a time at Trinity College Dublin (from 1898). He joined the family firm of Thomas Dockrell, Sons and Co. Ltd in 1900, becoming managing director and chairman on his father's death in 1929.

Family life
Dockrell married Alice Evelyn Hayes in June 1906, and they had four sons and one daughter. Two of his sons, Percy Dockrell and Maurice E. Dockrell were also Fine Gael TDs and councillors. His daughter was the swimmer, Marguerite Dockrell. His father, Sir Maurice Dockrell, was a Unionist Member of Parliament. His mother, Margaret Dockrell, was a suffragist, philanthropist, and councillor.

Politics
He was first elected at the 1932 general election as a Cumann na nGaedheal Teachta Dála (TD) for the Dublin County constituency, and was re-elected five times for the same constituency until he retired at the 1948 general election.

After retiring from the Dáil, Dockrell was elected to the 6th Seanad by the Industrial and Commercial Panel in 1948, but was defeated in the 1951 election for the 7th Seanad.

See also
Families in the Oireachtas

References

1880 births
1955 deaths
Cumann na nGaedheal TDs
Fine Gael TDs
Members of the 7th Dáil
Members of the 8th Dáil
Members of the 9th Dáil
Members of the 10th Dáil
Members of the 11th Dáil
Members of the 12th Dáil
Members of the 6th Seanad
Fine Gael senators